This page documents Catholic Church sexual abuse cases by country.

Catholic sexual abuse cases in Europe have been documented by cases in several dioceses in European nations. Investigation and widespread reporting of sexual abuse scandals were conducted in the early 21st century related to numerous dioceses in the United States of America; several American dioceses have filed for bankruptcy after settling civil lawsuits from victims. A significant number of cases have also been reported in Ireland, Australia, New Zealand, Canada, and countries in Europe, Latin America, Africa, and Asia.

In 2001, lawsuits were filed in the United States and Ireland, alleging that some priests had sexually abused minors and that their superiors had conspired to conceal and otherwise abet their criminal misconduct. In 2004, the John Jay Report tabulated a total of 4,392 priests and deacons in the U.S. against whom allegations of sexual abuse had been made. The numbers of reported abuse allegations and court cases has increased worldwide since then.

The U.N. Committee on the Rights of the Child  has asked for detailed information on the full extent of child abuse worldwide by priests, monks and nuns. It has also asked how the Holy See prevents abusers from contacting additional children and how the Holy See ensures that known crimes against children are reported to the police. In the past there were issues over the Church hierarchy failing to report abuse to law enforcement and allowing abusers further contact with children. 1 November 2013 was set as a deadline for receiving the information. In June 2021, a team of U.N. special rapporteurs for the Office of the High Commissioner for Human Rights have criticized the Vatican referring to persistent allegations that the Catholic Church had obstructed and failed to cooperate with domestic judicial proceedings, in order to prevent accountability for abusers and compensation for victims.

Prevalence 
In a statement read by Archbishop Silvano Maria Tomasi in September 2009, the Holy See stated, "We know now that in the last 50 years somewhere between 1.5% and 5% of the Catholic clergy has been involved in sexual abuse cases", adding that this figure was comparable to that of other groups and denominations. A 2010 article in Newsweek magazine reported that the figure for abuse of children by adults in the Catholic Church was similar to that in the general adult population.

A Perspective on Clergy Sexual Abuse by Dr. Thomas Plante, of the Catholic Santa Clara University and volunteer clinical associate professor at Stanford University, states that "approximately 4% of priests during the past half century (and mostly in the 1960s and 1970s) have had a sexual experience with a minor", which "is consistent with male clergy from other religious traditions and is significantly lower than the general adult male population which may double these numbers". Plante's article was based on a study done by John Jay College. It was compiled solely from data provided by leaders of U.S. Conference of Catholic Bishops, which paid John Jay College to do the study.

After widespread publicity about the abuse, in 2013 Barbara Blaine, of the Survivors Network of those Abused by Priests (SNAP), stated, "We are confident that the ICC will see sufficient evidence that high ranking Catholic officials are still knowingly enabling predators to harm and endanger children across the world, while concealing these heinous crimes even more effectively." A group had filed charges in the International Criminal Court (ICC) against the Catholic Church for what it said was crimes against humanity because of its policy on this issue. The ICC refused to investigate. SNAP representatives note that most Catholics are found in the Third World, where child molestation is more easily concealed. They argued that it was necessary to guard against "the tempting assumption that the worst of this scandal is somehow behind us."

Africa

Kenya 
In 2009 several people accused an Italian priest working in the country of sexual molestation. The Church assured them it was investigating the case, but that did not appear to happen. Kenyan police said they found no evidence and believed Sesana is innocent.

In 2010 a young Kenyan woman alleged that a Catholic priest had raped her, but the police and Church authorities had failed to follow up the allegations.

The 2011 Raidió Teilifís Éireann (RTÉ) documentary A Mission To Prey publicised Kenya's clerical abuse cases, saying they should have been handled with more transparency. It was discovered that this program mistakenly alleged that Fr. Kevin Reynolds was an abuser, causing him to be removed from his home and his parish ministry. RTÉ has subsequently apologised for this programme. It has stated that Reynolds was innocent of the charges stated. RTÉ has allowed continued access to this programme online, while upwards of 32 slander and libel cases are pending in reaction by alleged abusers.

In 2011 a Dutch bishop in Kenya was reported to be under probe over alleged sex abuse. He was alleged to have abused a minor 18 years before while serving as a priest in Ngong diocese. He was retired by the church.

Mauritius 
Henry Coombes revealed how he was sexually assaulted at the age of 11 in the late 1950s by a catholic priest from Ireland who was posted at Saint Joseph's College in Curepipe.

In September 2016 Teddy Labour, a 37-year old catholic priest, was arrested following complaints made to church officials Hériberto Cabrera and Jean-Maurice Labour by a 20-year old church goer. She had attended St. Louis Cathedral, Port-Louis where the priest kissed and molested her.

In October 2019 catholic priest Joseph-Marie Moctee was sentenced to 3 years in jail for molesting a 15-year old teenager at Cure de St Anne, a catholic church located at Chamarel in April 2015. Joseph-Marie Moctee had convinced the teenager and his friend to have dinner with him and to stay overnight at the church.

Tanzania 
St Michael's Catholic Boarding School, Soni, Tanzania

Fr Kit Cunningham, a prominent United Kingdom member of the Rosminian order, and three other priests, were exposed as paedophiles after Cunningham's death.
While at Soni, Cunningham committed sexual abuse that made the school, according to one pupil, "a loveless, violent and sad hellhole". Other pupils recall being photographed naked, hauled out of bed at night to have their genitals fondled, and other sexual abuse. Although known about by the Rosminians before Cunningham's death in 2010, the abuse was not reported by the media until 2011.
Formal action was launched by a group of former pupils who filed a civil suit at the civil court in Leicester, UK on 20 March 2013.

Settlement

The audited financial statements for the year ending 5 April 2015 report under the heading "Legal and safeguarding related costs" that "Last year’s report referred to legal claims which had been brought against the Charity concerning the welfare of children between approximately 1940 and 1985. A settlement has now been reached in relation to these claims." The Charity was liable also for the claimants' legal fees. The matter has had a significant impact on the Charity's finances with payment of their legal and settlement costs amounting to a total GBP 1,746,523 for the year.

Asia

East Timor 
 In November 2018, the Vatican defrocked American priest Richard Daschbach after the church found him guilty of sexual abuse of girls in the shelter he had established. In September 2020 East Timor's public prosecutor charged Daschbach with 14 counts of sexual abuse, pornographic material and domestic violence. On 22 February 2021 the trial against Daschbach started in East Timor.

Japan 
 In 2002 and 2012, at least five damage reports had been filed over clergy sexual abuse.

Philippines 
 In 2002 the Catholic Church apologized for sexual abuses, including adultery, homosexuality and child abuse by 200 priests over the previous 20 years.
 In 2003 at least 34 priests were suspended in a sex abuse scandal involving sexual harassment of women. Twenty men were from a single diocese.
 In 2011, a priest accused of sexually abusing a 17-year-old female minor was sheltered by his bishop, despite calls for his surrender to civil authorities.
 In 2017, a priest was arrested in Marikina for attempting to have sex with a 13-year-old girl.

India 

 In 2002, Mathew N. Schmalz noted that Catholic Church sexual abuse cases in India are generally not spoken about openly, stating "you would have gossip and rumors, but it never reaches the level of formal charges or controversies."
 In 2014, Raju Kokkan, the vicar of the Saint Paul's Church in Thaikkattussery, Thrissur, Kerala, was arrested on charges of raping a nine-year-old girl. According to Kerala Police, Kokkan had raped the child on several different occasions, including at least thrice in his office during the month of April. Kokkan promised to gift the child expensive vestments for her Holy Communion ceremony before sexually assaulting her. The abuse was revealed after the victim informed her parents that she had been raped by Kokkan on 25 April 2014. The priest subsequently fled to Nagercoil in the neighbouring state of Tamil Nadu, and was arrested by police on 5 May. Following the arrest, the Thrissur Archdiocese stated that the vicar had been removed from his position within the Church. Between February and April 2014, three other Catholic priests were arrested in the state of Kerala on charges of raping minors.
 In 2016, the Catholic Church reappointed a convicted and jailed priest in the Ootacamund Diocese in Tamil Nadu, with little regard for victims rights and children's safety.
 In 2017, Father Robin or Mathew Vadakkancheril of St Sebastian church in Kannur was arrested in Kochi on the charge of repeatedly raping a 15-year-old girl who later gave birth to a child. The baby is reported to have been taken to an orphanage without the mother's consent. In 2019, he was sentenced to 20 years in prison by the Thalassery POSCO court.
 In 2018, after much public outcry, Bishop Franco Mulakkal was arrested on 21 September by the Kerala Police. The Holy See had just 'temporarily' relieved him from his pastoral responsibilities. The nun who complained against Bishop Franco had mentioned to the police that he had repeatedly had unnatural sex with her on multiple occasions between 2014 and 2016.

Indonesia 
 From 2002 to 2020, 20 altar boys were abused by Syahril Parlindungan Marbun.

Europe

Austria 

Archdiocese of Vienna
In 1995 Hans Hermann Cardinal Groer stepped down as head of the Catholic Church in Austria following accusations of sexual misconduct. In 1998 he left the country and lost the duties of a Cardinal. Nevertheless, he still retained the title of a Cardinal.

Kremsmuenster Abbey
In March 2010, several monks were suspended at Kremsmunster Abbey, located in the Upper Austria city of Kremsmunster, for severe allegations of sexual abuse and physical violence. The reported incidences ranged over a period from the 1970s until the late 1990s and had been subject to police investigation. In July 2013 an Austrian court found Kremsmuenster Abbey director Alfons Mandorfer guilty in 24 documented cases of child abuse and sexual violence. The now laicized priest, who was accused of committing "sexual acts of differing intensity" on the pupils between 1973 and 1993, was sentenced to twelve years in prison. By 2013, the school had paid approximately €700,000 in compensation.

Belgium 

There have been several abuse cases in Belgium.

Diocese of Antwerp

Former parish priest Bruno Vos of Nieuwmoer parish in Kalmthout was officially charged with rape of a minor by the Belgian judiciary. He was also alleged to possess child pornography.

Croatia 
Archdiocese of Zagreb
 Ivan Čuček was convicted in 2000 of sexual abuse of 37 young girls, and sentenced to three years in prison. This term was later reduced by the Supreme Court to one-and-a-half years.

Archdiocese of Rijeka
 Drago Ljubičić, a Catholic priest on the isle of Rab, was convicted and sentenced to three years in prison for molesting five teenage boys. He will be the first Catholic priest in Croatia to serve prison time for sexual abuse. When asked by Catholic press agency Glas Koncila (prior to scandal) why children avoid going to church, he blamed the 'strong influence of communism on island Rab'.

Archdiocese of Zadar
 Nediljko Ivanov, former vicar of Bibinje, is the first priest in Croatia which has been convicted for pedophilia by a church court. Ivanov was first suspected in 2012 when four of his victims reported him to the State's Attorney Office for pedophile activities that occurred in the period from 1983 to 1991. Ivanov was not prosecuted in a civilian court due to statute of limitations of legally prescribed 15 years, because cases have been reported in 2012 or six years after the statute of limitations went into power. Congregation for the Doctrine of the Faith was also informed about the case, but it did not use its authority to remove a pedophile priest from the Church. Church Court ruled that Ivanov can still serve Mass, but was sentenced to fasting, prayer and was ordered to apologize to the victims that he sexually abused. One of the victims stated in 2014 that he finds the judgment satisfactory because everyone know about Ivanov being a pedophile, but he does not consider sentence to be fair. Ivanov lives in a home for retired priests in Zadar.

France 

In February 2019, Pope Francis alluded to the closure of a religious order due to the 'sexual slavery' of the nuns within it. Some sources identify the congregation he intended as a part of the Community of St. Jean. The Holy See's Press Office however claimed that "sexual manipulation had occurred within this women’s religious congregation, not actual sex slavery." On 3 June 2019, the French Catholic Church activated a sex abuse commission—made up of 22 legal professionals, doctors, historians, sociologists and theologians—which will obtain witness statements and deliver its conclusions by the end of 2020. In June 2020, the Independent Commission on Sexual Abuse in the Church (CIASE), which was established in June 2019, concluded that 3,000 children in France were sexually abused by Catholic clergy and officials since 1950 and that there was an average of 40 victims per year. On 11 November 2020, Jean-Marc Sauve, the head of the independent commission set up by the Catholic Church in France to investigate claims of sex abuse, acknowledged the his commission's sex abuse hotline, which closed on 31 October 2020, received 6,500 calls reporting sex abuse in a period 17 months.

A 2,500-page report was to be published in October 2021; the head of the independent commission investigating child sexual abuse in the French Catholic Church said that about 3,000 paedophiles, as a minimum estimate, had operated in the Church since 1950, with at least 330,000 children sexually abused. Pope Francis said that he was shamed by the church's failure to deal with paedophile priests in France. Young girls abused by nuns were not an infrequent occurrence, either.

Seine et Marne
 Henri Lebras was sentenced to ten years for the rape of a twelve-year-old boy between 1995 and 1998.

Germany 

In February 2010, Der Spiegel reported that more than 94 clerics and laymen have been suspected of sexual abuse since 1995. Thirty had been prosecuted because legal time constraints related to the occurrence of alleged crimes prevented prosecution of older cases. In 2017, it was further reported that at least 547 members of the prestigious Domspatzen choir in Regensburg were physically or sexually abused between 1945 and 1992.

On 25 September 2018, the German Catholic Bishops' Conference released a report (some data of which was leaked via Der Spiegel several days before its official publication) that reported that 3,677 children in Germany, mostly boys under age 13, were sexually abused by Catholic clergy members over the past seven decades". About 1,670 church workers, or 4.4% of the clergy, had been involved in the abuse which is "shocking and probably just the tip of the iceberg" according to Germany's Federal Justice Minister Katarina Barley. The report, commissioned by the Bishops' Conference in 2014, was not fully independent of the church and likely understated the activity, as journalists have been forbidden from looking at church files which could contain more reports of abuse. The full report was officially released by the German Catholic Church on 25 September, and included an apology by Cardinal Reinhard Marx, Bishop of Munich and Freising and head of the German Catholic Bishops' Conference, and other German bishops. The incidents were reported to have happened between the years 1946 and 2014. The report's author criticised the Church for denying him access to other Catholic institutions, including children's homes and schools, which could consequently not be included. It was also reported that local dioceses destroyed some files containing more reports of sex abuse. Some of the "predator priests" were transferred to other parishes in order to avoid scrutiny.

In August 2020, more than 1,400 people in Germany accused at least 654 monks, nuns and other members of the orders of sexually abusing them as children, teenagers, and as wards, going as far back as the 1950s. In December 2020, Catholic nuns who ran a former children's home in the German city of Speyer were implicated in transporting children to priests who would then sex abuse them.

A German Web site has a frequently updated sourced timeline of cases, international but focussed on Germany.

According to a February 2021 report in The Daily Beast, nuns from a convent in Speyer rented orphaned boys to German businessmen who forced them to participate in gang bangs and sex orgies. The nuns later punished the young boys if they were covered in semen or had wrinkled clothing.

Ireland 

In August 2018, a list was published which revealed that over 1,300 Catholic clergy in Ireland had been accused of sexual abuse, with 82 of them getting convicted.

Archdiocese of Dublin

Several priests convicted of abusing children in the United States were Irish nationals, notably Patrick Colleary, Anthony O'Connell and Oliver O'Grady. One of the most widely known cases of sexual abuse in Ireland involved Brendan Smyth, who, between 1945 and 1989, sexually abused and assaulted 20 children in parishes in Belfast, Dublin and the United States.

Catholic Boy Scouts of Ireland

In May 2020, it was revealed that prior to the 2004 merger with the SAI which formed Scouting Ireland, Catholic Boy Scouts of Ireland covered up sex abuse committed by people who served in the organization. In a period spanning decades, both the CBSI and SAI shielded 275 known or suspected predators who abused children after becoming aware of the reported acts of abuse. Scouting Ireland backed the findings of the report and issued an apology.

Diocese of Ferns

The Ferns Inquiry 2005 – On 22 October 2005 a government-commissioned report compiled by a former Irish Supreme Court judge delivered an indictment of the handling of clerical sex abuse in the Irish diocese of Ferns.

Italy 

 The Italian Government has a treaty with the Vatican that guarantees areas of immunity to Vatican officials, including bishops and priests. This has reportedly made it difficult to get accurate figures as to how many priests and other religious officials are alleged to have committed sexual abuse. In October 2018, however, Italian victim rights group Rete l'Abuso asserting that the Italian justice system has treated about 300 cases of predator priests and nuns and netted 150–170 convictions since the year 2000.
 Three former students claimed in 2010 that they had been abused, and 65 former students signed statements saying that they or other students had been abused by Catholic priests when attending the Antonio Provolo Institute for the Deaf, a Catholic school for deaf children in Verona, Italy. The abuse, reportedly by 24 priests including the late bishop of Verona, is alleged to have occurred from the 1950s to 1980s.
 Former Roman Rota judge Msgr. Pietro Armenta was taken into police custody in March 2017. In February 2018 he pleaded guilty to possession of child pornography and was sentenced to 14 months' imprisonment, suspended.

In Italy  the issue of Catholic sexual abuse had been largely buried. Following an investigation which found thousands of perpetrators and hundreds of thousands of victims in France, there were calls for the church to "find the courage to investigate" clerical child abuse in other countries, including specifically Italy. Hans Zollner, a German priest and adviser to Pope Francis, said "The Catholic church in other countries must now find the same courage as in France. I hope in Italy too. The church is not immaculate, unfortunately it is also made up of sin and crimes."

Malta 
 Eighty-four allegations had been made as of April 2010. Lawrence Grech, one of many alleged victims, complained that he was abused in an orphanage. Grech complained in 2010 that the Church had been investigating cases for seven years without doing enough that is effective. The pope spoke personally to Grech and other victims, praising their courage in coming forward. A Maltese court found that Fr Charles Pulis and Fr Godwin Scerri sexually abused children, and sentenced the two men to six years and five years in prison, respectively. The church officially regretted the delays before investigations; it promised to remove Fr Pulis from the priesthood.
 Fr. Anthony Mercieca, who was accused by former Florida Congressman Mark Foley of molesting him as a teenager and has admitted "inappropriate encounters", now lives in Malta. In year 2020 Fr Donald Bellizzi was sentenced to three years in prison for sexually abusing a teenage boy.

Monaco
On 3 December 2020, William McCandless, a member of the Wilmington, Delaware-based religious order Oblates de St. Francis De Sales who was formerly assigned to DeSales University in Lehigh County, Pennsylvania, was charged in Philadelphia, Pennsylvania, for possession of child pornography. He also served as an adviser to Monaco’s royal family, Grace Kelly, the late mother of Monaco's leader Prince Albert, was also a native of Philadelphia. Much of McCandless' child pornography was imported from overseas as well. McCandless has been ordered to remain under house arrest until the outcome of his trial.

Netherlands 

Since 1995 the church established new procedures to receive reports of sexual abuse. Alleged victims can notify a central church institution, called Secretariaat Rooms-Katholiek Kerkgenootschap (SRRK). The church made this change in response to charges of alleged cases of sexual abuse by religious members of the Roman Catholic Church.

On 14 May 1998 damages of €56,800 were paid by the diocese of Rotterdam to the victim of sexual abuse by a diocesan priest; this was part of a settlement to avoid civil prosecution.

Father J. Ceelen, pastor of the parishes of Lieshout and of Mariahout (municipality of Laarbeek), quit his post after allegations of sexual abuse on 1 September 2005.

In February 2010 Salesians were accused of sexual abuse in their juvenate Don Rua in 's-Heerenberg. Salesian bishop of Rotterdam van Luyn pleaded for a thorough investigation.

In 2011 the Deetman Commission, acting on the 2010 request of the Conference of Bishops and the Dutch Religious Conference, reported on its inquiry into abuse cases from 1945 to 2010 affecting children entrusted to the care of the church in the Netherlands.

Norway 
Georg Müller, a former Catholic bishop in Trondheim, Norway, has admitted to sexually abusing an altar boy in the 1980s when he served as a priest there. Müller, who retired as bishop in 2009, said there were no other victims.

Poland 

In 2013 a succession of child sex abuse scandals within the church, and the poor response by the church, became a matter of widespread public concern. The church resisted demands to pay compensation to victims. On 27 September 2018, however, Bishop Romuald Kamiński of the Diocese of Warsaw-Praga stated that Polish church leaders were working on a document, to be published later, on priestly sexual abuse of minors in Poland, and ways to prevent it. Cases were being evaluated by Warsaw courts, and the priests involved were banned from working with minors; three were suspended from all pastoral work. According to Archbishop Wojciech Polak, the head of Poland's Catholic Church, the document will include data on the scale of priestly sex abuse in Poland.

On 8 October 2018, a victims group mapped out 255 cases of alleged sex abuse in Poland.

On 11 May 2019, Polak issued an apology on behalf of the entire Catholic Church in Poland. The same day, Tell No One, a documentary detailing accounts of sex abuse by Catholic church workers in Poland, went viral, obtaining 8.1 million viewers on YouTube by 13 May. The film accused former Polish leader Lech Walesa's personal priest Franciszek Cybula, who is now deceased, of sexual abuse and noted that he transferred between parishes. The film also alleges that Rev. Dariusz Olejniczak, a priest who was sentenced for molesting seven-year-old girls, was allowed to continue working with young people despite his conviction. On 14 May 2019, Poland's ruling Law and Justice (PiS) party, which has long had an alliance with the nation's Catholic Bishops, agreed to increase penalties for child sex abuse by raising the maximum prison sentence from 12 years to 30 years and raising the age of consent from 15 to 16. Prosecutor and PiS lawmaker Stanislaw Piotrowicz, who heads the Polish Parliament's Justice Commission, has also been criticized for playing down the actions of a priest who was convicted for inappropriately touching and kissing young girls.

On 16 May 2020, Polak asked the Vatican to investigate sex abuse claims involving brothers Marek and Tomasz Sekielski. The two brothers released a popular YouTube documentary titled Hide and Seek, which detailed their allegations that they were molested by a Polish Catholic priest. Polak expressed support towards the allegations, stating "The film... shows that protection standards for children and adolescents in the Church were not respected."

Diocese of Kielce

In Tell No One a priest known as Father Jan A., who served the Diocese of Kielce in the village of Topola, confessed to molesting a young girl.

Diocese of Opole

In 2018 the Bishop of Opole, Andrzej Czaja in a letter to the faithful read at all masses in the diocese on Sunday, 7 October, apologized to the victims and admitted that 6 priests from his diocese were found guilty of sexual abuse against minors.

Archdiocese of Poznań

In March 2002 the Archbishop of Poznań, Juliusz Paetz, stepped down following accusations, which he denied, of sexually molesting young priests.

Diocese of Kalisz
On 25 June 2020, Pope Francis ordered Bishop Edward Janiak, age 67, to resign from his duties as bishop of the Roman Catholic Diocese of Kalisz for protecting priests who committed acts of sex abuse. He appointed Archbishop Grzegorz Ryś of Łódź as apostolic administrator sede plena, which means he has full administrative authority. On 17 October 2020, Pope Francis accepted Janiak's resignation from the diocese.

Diocese of Płock

In early 2007 allegations surfaced that former bishop Stanislaw Wielgus (later very briefly Archbishop of Warsaw) was aware that several priests in his former diocese of Płock were sexually abusing minors.

Diocese of Warsaw-Praga
On 27 September 2018, Warsaw-Praga Bishop Romuald Kamiński apologized to those who had been victims of sexual abuse in his Diocese.

Archdiocese of Gdansk 
In 2019, three protestors toppled a statue of Rev. Henryk Jankowski following revelations that he had sexually abused Barbara Borowiecka when she was a girl. Jankowski was the subject of a criminal investigation in 2004 related to alleged sexual abuse of a boy; the case was dropped. He was defrocked in 2004. He died in 2010 without having been convicted of sex abuse. Lech Walsea's personal chaplain, Rev. Franciszek Cybula, had been accused of sex abuse while serving in the clergy. On 13 August 2020, Pope Francis removed Gdansk Archbishop Slawoj Leszek Glodz, who was among those who covered up abuse committed by Jankowski and Cybula. Glodz had presided over Cybula's funeral. Although Glodz had turned 75, the required age for Catholic bishops to offer their resignation, his removal by Pope Francis was described as "cleaning house". It is highly unusual for the pope to accept such a resignation on a prelate's birthday.

Archdiocese of Wroclaw

On 6 November 2020, The Holy See's nuncio to Poland announced that following an investigation by the Holy See regarding sex abuse allegations, Cardinal Henryk Gulbinowicz was now "barred from any kind of celebration or public meeting and from using his episcopal insignia, and is deprived of the right to a cathedral funeral and burial." Gulbinowicz was also ordered to pay an "appropriate sum" to his alleged victims.
Gulbinowicz is the former archbishop of Wroch, whose support of the trade union Solidarity played a critical role in the collapse of communism in Poland. On 16 November 2020, 10 days after the Vatican, Gulbinowicz, but, as a result of the Vatican displinary action, could not have a funeral in Wroclaw's Cathedral of St. John the Baptist or to be buried in the cathedral.

Portugal
In Portugal an independent commission commissioned by the Catholic Church reported in February 2023 that at least 4,815 children had been abused by Catholic clergy since 1950.

Slovenia 
Archdiocese of Ljubljana
 Franc Frantar – detained in 2006 for sexual abuse of up to 16 minors. He was later sentenced to five years in prison. He initially escaped prosecution by escaping to Malawi to work there as a missionary, but returned to Slovenia after an Interpol notice was issued.
 Marko Rupnik – In November 2022, Italian media reports began to appear alleging that Jesuit priest Rupnik had sexually and psychologically abused a number of nuns three decades earlier in the 1990s in a convent in Slovenia when he was their spiritual director. In December 2022, a 58-year-old ex-nun gave an interview to an Italian newspaper, describing several allegations of sexual and psychological abuse committed by Rupnik against her and fellow nuns. The Slovenian Jesuit headquarters and the Vatican acknowledged the case, saying Rupnik had been excommunicated by the Vatican's Dicastery for the Doctrine of the Faith several years earlier, but the excommunication was lifted after Rupnik repented, and although "partial sanctions" remained in place, the Dicastery stated that the case exceeded the statute of limitations. The Jesuit order and the Vatican made several public statements that several people involved found "contradictory", causing some leading Jesuits to call for a full review of how the Jesuit order and Vatican handled the case. On 3 January 2023, Catholic online newspaper The New Daily Compass reported that Rupnik had retired from his public positions into a monastery. On 6 January 2023, the Slovenian Jesuit order said in a statement they 'believe in the sincerity of the nuns and other victims who have spoken out about their suffering and other circumstances regarding emotional, sexual and spiritual abuse by our confrere. We sincerely ask for forgiveness from all.' Their testimonies 'show beyond doubt that the competent Church leaders did not take appropriate action, which has increased and prolonged the untold suffering of a number of women'. Reuters called the case "embarrassing" for the Jesuit order, 'but also for Pope Francis, who is a member of the order.'

Sweden 
Diocese of Stockholm
One child was sexually abused by a priest several years in the late 1950s. When the child raised the issue at the time, the priest was protected and the abuse was kept quiet by the church. The victim finally reported the abuse to the Stockholm diocese in December 2005. The victim demanded a public apology from the church. In June 2007 Sweden's Catholic church made a public apology in two newspapers.

United Kingdom

Vatican

Holy See

On 23 June 2018, a Holy See tribunal convicted former diplomat Monsignor Carlo Capella for possessing child pornography while in the Holy See's U.S. nunciature and handed him a five-year prison sentence.

On 9 December 2019, lawyers brought a sexual abuse lawsuit against the Holy See, regarding an alleged cover up of abuse committed by former Cardinal Theodore McCarrick.

On 19 November 2020, four people who accused McCarrick of sexually abusing them filed a lawsuit against the Holy See in federal court in Newark, New Jersey, saying it had failed in its oversight of McCarrick over whom it exercised complete control as his employer. The Holy See says priests are not its employees and that its status as a foreign sovereign is a defense from such a suit.

Vatican City
On 14 October 2020, the first ever criminal trial held within the Vatican City for sex abuse began, and involves a priest accused of sexually abusing a former St. Pius X youth seminary student between 2007 and 2012 and another for aiding and abetting the abuse. The accused abuser, Rev. Gabriele Martinelli, 28, was a seminarian and has since become a priest. The other defendant is the seminary's 72-year-old former rector Rev. Enrico Radice, who is charged with aiding and abetting the alleged abuse.

North America

Canada 

Archdiocese of St. John's

In the 1990s, criminal proceedings began against members of the Christian Brothers in Newfoundland. In July 2020, Rev. Peter Power was charged with charges of sexual touching, sexual assault and committing an indecent act involving two teenaged boys, aged 18 and 16 years old at a residence in a small Newfoundland community earlier in the year. Though officially retired, Power was still occasionally active in Catholic ministry. The same month, the Court of Appeal of Newfoundland and Labrador unanimously reversed a 2018 Canadian Supreme Court ruling and ruled that the Archdiocese of Saint John's was liable for the sexual abuse committed at the Mount Cashel Orphanage in the 1950s and 1960s.

Basilian Orders
As of August 2020, at least three Canadian Basilian priests, Fathers Robert Whyte, John O'Keefe, and William Hodgson Marshall. have been convicted of committing acts of sex abuse. In October 2020, an investigation by CityNews found that 14 Basilians in Canada were accused of committing acts of sex abuse.

Military Ordinariate of Canada
On 7 September 2020, Canadian Armed Forces spokesman Maj. Travis Smyth acknowledged that Capt. Jean El-Dahdouh, a Maronite Church military chaplain found guilty the previous year of assault and sexual assault after a series of incidents at the Nordik Spa-Nature in Chelsea, Quebec, was still a member of the Canadian military, but he was expected to soon be released from the armed forces.

On 16 November 2020, documents which the Canadian Forces sought keep sealing for 40 years were public. The documents revealed that Canadian Forces knew that Catholic Chaplain Capt. Angus McRae had victims before his 1980 sex abuse conviction for children to his quarters at an Edmonton military base and gave them alcohol before sexually assaulting them.

Archdiocese of Montreal
On 25 November 2020, former Quebec Superior Court justice Pepita Capriolo released a report which found that some former officials in the Archdiocese of Montreal took no action against pedophile priest Brian Boucher after receiving reports that he sexually abused boys, stating, among other things, that "The primary culprit is the lack of accountability of the people involved in Boucher's education, training and career. Complaints were 'passed on' and no one took responsibility for acting on them." The Catholic church assigned Capriolo to the investigate the Archdiocese of Montreal after Boucher pled to sex abuse charges in January 2019 and received an eight-year prison sentence. Among the former Archdiocese of Montreal officials named in Capriololo's report as having knowledge of reports of sex abuse against Boucher where Cardinal Marc Ouellet, once a candidate for the papacy, Cardinal Jean-Claude Turcotte, now deceased, and Anthony Mancini, the Archbishop of Halifax.

Archdiocese of Vancouver

In 2019, the Archdiocese of Vancouver publicly named nine clergymen who were criminally convicted of sexual abuse or who had civil lawsuits related to abuse settled against them. It was also acknowledged that the archdiocese was aware of 36 sex abuse cases since the 1950s, which involved 26 children. The Archdiocese of Vancouver was the first among Canada's 60 Catholic dioceses to make this information public. In August 2020, a new sex abuse lawsuit was filed against the Archdiocese of Vancouver. The lead plaintiff, identified only by the initials K.S. in the court documents, said the priest in charge of St. Francis of Assisi School, Father Michael Conaghan, sexually assaulted her while she was a student at the school in the 1980s. She was around 11 years old at the time of the alleged abuse. Conaghan, who died four days after the lawsuit was filed, was not among the nine clergy listed by the Archiocese in 2019. The lawsuit also alleges the Archdiocese of Vancouver followed marching orders from the Vatican for years on how to bury allegations of abuse within its parishes. On 14 December 2020, it was revealed the Archdiocese of Vancouver had settled more sex abuse cases involved three additional priests who sexually abuse 13 previously undisclosed victims. The three priests named were also not previously listed on the Archdiocese of Vancouver's credibly accused list.

El Salvador

In November 2015, sex abuse scandals in El Salvador's sole non-military Catholic diocese, the Archdiocese of San Salvador, started coming to light when the archdiocese's third highest-ranking priest Jesus Delgado, who was also the biographer and personal secretary of the Salvadoran Archbishop Oscar Romero was dismissed by the archdiocese after its investigation showed that he had molested a girl, now 42 years of age, when she was between the ages of 9 and 17. Due to the statute of limitations, Delgado could not face criminal charges. In December 2016, a canonical court convicted Delgado and two other El Salvador priests, Francisco Galvez and Antonio Molina, of committing acts of sex abuse between the years 1980 and 2000 and laicized them from the priesthood. In November 2019, the archdiocese acknowledged sex abuse committed by a priest identified as Leopoldo Sosa Tolentino in 1994 and issued a public apology to his victim. Tolentino was suspended from ministry and began the canonical trial process. It was also reported at this time that another El Salvador priest had been laicized in 2019 after pleading guilty to sex abuse in a Holy See trial and is serving a 16-year prison sentence after being convicted in a criminal trial.

Mexico 

Fr. Marcial Maciel (1920–2008) founded the Legion of Christ, a Catholic order of priests originating in Mexico. Nine former seminarians of his order accused Maciel of molestation. Maciel maintained his innocence of the accusations.

United States 

Archdiocese of Anchorage

In 2007, the Oregon Province of the Society of Jesus (which includes priests in the territory of Alaska, Idaho, Montana, Oregon and Washington) made a $50 million payout to over 100 Inuit who alleged that they had been sexually abused as children in Alaska. It was the largest settlement by any province of the Jesuit order. The Society of Jesus priests are an independent religious institute reporting directly to the Pope. The settlement did not require the Jesuit priests to admit to having molested Inuit children. Allegations named 13 or 14 priests who were said to have molested children under their care over a period of 30 years. None of these priests was ever criminally prosecuted for such allegations.

The Diocese of Fairbanks faced separate cases because it owned and managed the churches in which the priests served. The 135 lawsuits filed against the diocese had been reduced to ten by November 2007 and were expected to be mediated and settled. But in 2008 the Diocese filed for Chapter 11 bankruptcy, saying that settlement efforts had failed and it did not have funds to pay the nearly 150 plaintiffs who alleged sexual abuse by priests or church workers from the 1950s to the 1980s.

Archdiocese of Boston

Allegations of sexual misconduct by priests of the Archdiocese of Boston and, following revelations of a cover-up by the Archbishop of Boston, Cardinal Bernard Francis Law, were reported by the Boston Globe in numerous articles in 2004. Roman Catholics in other dioceses of the United States began to investigate similar situations. Cardinal Law's actions prompted public scrutiny of the United States Conference of Catholic Bishops and the steps taken in response to past and current allegations of sexual misconduct by priests. The events in the Archdiocese of Boston became a national scandal, as were revelations of cover ups by numerous dioceses across the country.

Archdiocese of Chicago

Daniel McCormack, a self-confessed sexually abusive priest, was convicted and sentenced to five years in prison for abusing five boys (aged 8–12 years) in 2001.

Diocese of Cleveland
Father Robert McWilliams, 40, was indicted on 1 July 2020 on federal criminal charges: two counts of sex trafficking of a minor, three counts of sexual exploitation of children, one count of transportation of child pornography, one count of receiving and distributing depictions of minors engaged in sexually explicit conduct, and one count of possession of child pornography.

 Diocese of Crookston
Rev. Joseph Palanivel Jeyapaul was charged with molesting two teenage girls at a Catholic church in Greenbush, Minnesota, a small rural town near the Canada–United States border. The abuse occurred in 2004. Charges were filed in 2006 and amended in 2007. Without facing legal punishment, Jevapaul returned to his home diocese in Ootacamund, India. As of 2010 he was working in the diocesan office. A Roseau County, Minnesota attorney is seeking to extradite the priest from India in a criminal case involving one of the girls.
The Archbishop of Madras (now called "Chennai"), India, has asked Jeyapaul to return to the US to face the charges. Jevapaul has said that he will not fight extradition if the US seeks it.

Diocese of Davenport

On 10 October 2006, the Diocese of Davenport, Iowa filed for Chapter 11 bankruptcy protection because of settlement claims related to sexual abuse by clergy.

Archdiocese of Dubuque

In 2006 the archdiocese settled a number of claims of sexual abuse, and the Archbishop offered a personal apology.

Diocese of Fall River

Father James Porter was a Roman Catholic priest who was convicted of molesting 28 children; He admitted sexually abusing at least 100 of both sexes over a period of 30 years, starting in the 1960s. Bishop Sean O'Malley of the Diocese of Fall River settled 101 abuse claims and initiated a zero-tolerance policy against sexual abuse. He also instituted one of the first comprehensive sexual abuse policies in the Roman Catholic Church.

On 11 December 2020, Father Mark R. Hesson, also known as "Father Mark", of Hyannisport, Massachusetts, was indicted on two counts of rape, one count of indecent assault and battery on a child under age 14, and one count of intimidation of a witness. Hesson was known to many locals because of his past work at Our Lady of Victory Church. He had delivered the homily at Senator Edward "Ted" Kennedy's funeral in August 2009.

Diocese of Honolulu

Reverend Joseph Bukoski, III, SS.CC., Honolulu, Hawaii, a member of the Congregation of the Sacred Hearts of Jesus and Mary, was canonically removed in 2003 as the pastor of Maria Lanakila Catholic Church in Lahaina by Bishop Francis X. DiLorenzo for allegations relating to sexual improprieties some 30 years earlier. Bukoski issued a written public apology to his victim on 12 November 2005.

Reverend Mr. James "Ron" Gonsalves, Wailuku, Hawaii, administrator of Saint Ann Roman Catholic Church in Waihee, Maui, pleaded guilty on 17 May 2006 to several counts of sexual assault of a 12-year-old male. Bishop Clarence Richard Silva has permanently withdrawn his faculties and has initiated laicization proceedings against Deacon Gonsalves with the Congregation for the Doctrine of the Faith.

Archdiocese of Los Angeles

The Archdiocese of Los Angeles agreed to pay out 60 million dollars to settle 45 lawsuits; it faces more than 450 other pending cases. According to the Associated Press, 22 priests were named in the settlement, with some cases going back as far as the 1930s. 20 million dollars of the total was paid by the insurers of the archdiocese. The main administrative office of the archdiocese is due to be sold to cover the cost of these and future lawsuits. The archdiocese will settle about 500 cases for about $600 million.

Diocese of Memphis
The Diocese of Memphis reached a $2 million settlement with a man who was abused as a boy by Father Juan Carlos Duran. This priest had a history of sexual misconduct with juveniles in St. Louis, Missouri, as well as Panama, and Bolivia.

Archdiocese of Miami

Since 1966, the Archdiocese of Miami insurance programs have paid $26.1 million in settlement, legal, and counseling costs associated with sexual misconduct allegations made by minors involving priests, laity, and religious brothers and sisters.

Archdiocese of Milwaukee

A 2003 report on the sexual abuse of minors by clergy in the Archdiocese of Milwaukee revealed that allegations of sexually assaulting minors had been made against 58 ordained men. By early 2009, the Archdiocese of Milwaukee had spent approximately $26.5 million in attorney fees and settlements. Under Archbishop Timothy Dolan, the archdiocese was able to avoid bankruptcy from lawsuits.

A Wisconsin priest, the Rev. Lawrence C Murphy, who taught at the former St. John School for the Deaf in the Milwaukee suburb of St. Francis, Wisconsin, from 1950 to 1974, allegedly molested more than 200 deaf boys. Several U.S. bishops warned the Holy See that failure to act on the matter could embarrass the church. Murphy was moved by Milwaukee Archbishop William E Cousins to Superior, Wisconsin, a small city near Lake Superior. During his final 24 years, he worked with children in parishes, schools, and a juvenile detention center. He died in 1998. As of March 2010, there were four outstanding lawsuits against the Archdiocese of Milwaukee in the case.

Archdiocese of New Orleans
The Archdiocese of New Orleans filed for bankruptcy on 1 May 2020, saying it needed reorganization to provide time to develop a plan for settling claims using its assets and insurance.

Diocese of Oakland
In 1981, the former Rev. Stephen Kiesle was convicted of tying up and molesting two boys in a California church rectory. From 1981 to 1985, Bishop John Stephen Cummins, who oversaw Kiesle, contacted the Holy See about laicizing him. Then-cardinal Joseph Ratzinger, the future Pope Benedict XVI, responded by letter that the case needed more time, as it was "necessary to consider the good of the Universal Church" and "the detriment that granting the dispensation" could provoke among the faithful. In 1987, the Holy See laicized Kiesle. The letter was widely regarded as evidence of Ratzinger's role in blocking the removal of pedophile priests. Holy See officials responded that that interpretation rested on a misreading of the letter, in which the issue was not whether Kiesle should be laicized but whether he should be granted the dispensation he had requested from the obligation of chastity. By refusing to grant such a dispensation right away in the Kiesle case, Ratzinger was actually being tough with an abuser, not lax.

Archdiocese of Omaha
In 2018, the Archdiocese of Omaha unveiled the names of 38 priests and other clergy members who have been credibly accused of sexual misconduct, a move prompted by a request from the state's top prosecutor. At least two men on the list where convicted and served prison sentences for molesting children. Among those listed was defrocked Omaha priest Daniel Herek, who was sentenced to prison in 1999 for sexually assaulting and videotaping a 14-year-old boy. He also served jail time several years later for exposing himself in an Omaha parking lot as well. John Fiala, who left the Omaha Archdiocese in 1996, was also among those listed. Fiala died in 2017 in a Texas prison after being convicted of sexually abusing a teenage boy and of trying to hire a hit man to kill the victim. The 2018 list was also accompanied by a written apology from Omaha Archbishop George Lucas.

Diocese of Helena
During his tenure as the Bishop of Helena, Montana, Archbishop Elden Francis Curtiss chose to reassign a priest who had been accused of pedophilia in 1959, later admitting that he had not properly examined the church's personnel file on the individual concerned. Curtiss faced similar criticism in 2001 in regard to a priest accused of accessing child pornography. Curtiss, it was alleged, had failed to bring the case to the attention of the authorities, and had chosen to send the priest for counseling and to reassign the priest, removing him from his high-school teaching position but reassigning him to a middle-school.

Diocese of Orange, California

On 3 January 2005 Bishop Tod Brown of the Diocese of Orange apologized to 87 alleged victims of sexual abuse and announced a settlement of $100 million following two years of mediation.

Diocese of Palm Beach

Joseph Keith Symons resigned as ordinary in 1998 after admitting he molested five boys while he was a pastor. Symons' successor, Anthony O'Connell, resigned in 2002, after admitting that he, too, had engaged in sexual abuse.

Catholic Church in Pennsylvania

Archdiocese of Philadelphia

According to a 2005 investigation, while serving as assistant vicar for administration in 1996, Bishop Cistone was involved with silencing a nun who tried to alert parishioners at St. Gabriel parish about abuse by a priest. According to the report, there were several other instances of priest sexual abuse that Cistone was complicit in covering up.

Diocese of Peoria

Coadjutor Bishop John J. Myers of Peoria was among the two-thirds of sitting bishops and acting diocese administrators that the Dallas Morning News found had allowed priests accused of sexual abuse to continue working.

Diocese of Phoenix

On 21 November 2005, Monsignor Dale Fushek of the Diocese of Phoenix was arrested and charged with 10 criminal misdemeanor counts related to alleged inappropriate sexual contact with teens and young adults.

Archdiocese of Portland (Oregon)

The Archdiocese of Portland filed for Chapter 11 reorganization on 6 July 2004, hours before two abuse trials were set to begin. Portland became the first Catholic diocese to file for bankruptcy. An open letter to the archdiocese's parishioners explained the archbishop's motivation.

Archdiocese of San Antonio
John Salazar was sentenced to life in prison for sexually assaulting an 18-year-old parishioner.

Diocese of San Diego

On 27 February 2007, the Diocese of San Diego filed for Chapter 11 protection, hours before the first of about 150 lawsuits was due to be heard.

Diocese of Savannah

In October 2009, the diocese of Savannah paid $4.24 million to settle a lawsuit which alleged that Lessard allowed a priest named Wayland Brown to work in the diocese when Lessard knew that Brown was a serial child molester who posed a danger to children.

Diocese of Spokane
Under Bishop William S. Skylstad the Diocese of Spokane declared bankruptcy in December 2004. As part of its bankruptcy, the diocese has agreed to pay at least $48 million as compensation. This payout has to be agreed to by the victims and a judge before it will be made. According to federal bankruptcy judge, Gregg W. Zive, money for the settlement would come from insurance companies, the sale of church property, contributions from Catholic groups and from the diocese's parishes.

Diocese of Stockton

Fr. Oliver O'Grady molested multiple children in Stockton. The 2006 documentary Deliver Us from Evil is based on accusations that Bishop Roger Mahony knew that Oliver O'Grady was an active pedophile.

Diocese of Tucson
The Diocese of Tucson filed for bankruptcy in September 2004. It reached an agreement with plaintiffs, which the bankruptcy judge approved on 11 June 2005, specifying terms that included allowing the diocese reorganization to continue in return for a $22.2 million settlement.

Diocese of Wheeling–Charleston, West Virginia

Bishop Michael J. Bransfield resigned, effective immediately, in September 2018 over unspecified allegations of sexual misconduct.

Oceania

Australia 

In 2017, the Royal Commission into Institutional Responses to Child Sexual Abuse established that some 4,444 claimants alleged incidents of child sexual abuse in 4,756 reported claims to Catholic Church authorities (some claimants made a claim of child sexual abuse against more than one Catholic Church authority) and at least 1,880 suspected abusers from 1980 to 2015. Most of those suspected of abuse were Catholic priests and religious brothers and 62 percent of the survivors who told the commission they were abused in religious institutions were abused in a Catholic facility. By means of a weighted index, the Commission found that at 75 archdioceses/dioceses and religious institutes with priest members examined, some 7 per cent of priests who worked in Australia between 1950 and 2009. On 3 June 2019, 18 months after being ordered to do so by the commission, the Australian Catholic Church published its National Catholic Safeguarding Standards. The standards closely parallel the commission's recommendations as well as norms enshrined by the government in the National Principles for Child Safe Organizations, although some provisions were watered down. One notable alteration concerned the number of hours per year that people should be undergoing professional and pastoral supervision, which was reduced from the recommended 12 hours to 6 hours.

The Salvation Army, too, has not escaped scrutiny. According to the investigation, hundreds of kids were sexually abused at Australia's Salvation Army boys' homes in Queensland and New South Wales in the 1960s and 1970s.

Archdiocese of Sydney
 Ross Murrin: Catholic brother pleaded guilty to sexually abusing eight male students.

Archdiocese of Melbourne

There were several cases of sexual abuse in the Melbourne Archdiocese.

 Michael Charles Glennon: former diocesan priest, sentenced to at least 15 years in jail for sexually abusing four Aboriginal boys between 1984 and 1991.
 Gerry Francis Ridsdale: convicted in 1994, he pleaded guilty on 46 sexual offenses.
 Wilfred James Baker: sentenced to four years in prison (parole after two years) for crimes involving eight boys.
 David Daniel: sentenced to six years' jail, with parole after 4½ years, for molesting four boys, a girl and an adult male.
 Paul Pavlou: convicted on 29 June 2009 of committing an indecent act with a child under 16 and of being knowingly in possession of child pornography. He was sentenced to an 18-month jail sentence suspended for 24 months and to a two-year community based order. He was registered on the Sex Offenders Register for 15 years. These offences occurred in 2005–2006 while he was the priest at Healesville in the Archdiocese of Melbourne.
 Francis Klep SDB: convicted of indecent assault in 1994, and charged with an additional five counts. He moved to Samoa, but in 2004 the Samoan government made moves to deport him from the country after becoming aware of the previous conviction and charges.

In September 2020, the Australian state of Queensland passed legislation which makes it so religious institutions, such as the Catholic Church and their members are no longer able to use the sanctity of confession as a defence against failing to report material information about the sexual abuse of children. Under the new Queensland law, clergy who refuse to report confessions of sex abuse will face a maximum sentence of three years in prison. In October 2020, the Royal Commission into Institutional Responses to Child Sexual Abuse found that the church had failed to intervene against Thomas Butler, a Marist Brother known as Brother Patrick, when students reported that he sexually abused them within the three-year period he taught at Queensland capital Brisbane's Marist College Ashgrove. Butler had received sex abuse complaints in between 1991 and 1993.  Provincial of the Marist Brothers in Australia, Brother Peter Carroll, delivered an apology at the royal commission's public hearing.

New Zealand 

The abuse scandal at the Marylands School is an important chapter in the clerical abuse affairs in New Zealand but other cases have also emerged.

South America

Argentina 
On 17 August 2019, Argentina Bishop Sergio Buenanueva of San Francisco, Cordoba, acknowledged the history of sex abuse in the Catholic Church in Argentina. Buenanueva, who was labeled as a "Prelate" for the Argentine Catholic Church, also stated that the church's sex abuse crisis in Argentina, which is Pope Francis's native country, was "just beginning". On 15 July 2020, it was revealed that a lawyer had issued criminal charges against Archbishops Eduardo Martin of Rosario and Sergio Fenoy of Santa Fe de la Vera Cruz for seeking to "supplant the public prosecutor's office" by encouraging complaints to another body.

A Network of Survivors of Ecclesiastical Abuse in Argentina has been set up.

Archdiocese of La Plata
Accused Diocese of Mendoza priest Fr. Nicola Corradi was also charged by authorities in Buenos Aires province of sexually abusing children at a school in La Plata. The Antonio Provolo Institute for the Deaf in Mendoza province, where Corradi was also accused of molesting children, kept secret archives in the province's city of La Plata. The La Plata school where Corradi is accused of molesting children is also a sister school to the Antonio Provolo Institute. Corradi was later convicted for the Mendoza sex abuse charges and received a prison sentence of 42 years.

Diocese of Orán
On 10 June 2019, former Orán Bishop Gustavo Zanchetta was criminally charged with sexually abusing two seminarians. Zanchetta, who was one of Pope Francis's first appointments in his home country, was first accused of "strange behaviour" in 2015 when pornographic pictures, including naked selfies, were found on his phone. In August 2017, Pope Francis required Zanchetta to resign as Bishop of Orán, citing "health reasons", but then appointed him to serve as Assessor, or Councilor, to the Administration of the Patrimony of the Apostolic See. He was barred from leaving the country, had to undergo a psychiatric evaluation, and faced up to ten years in prison if convicted. On 28 May 2019 Pope Francis said a Holy See trial would begin soon. A anonymous local priest told Crux on 13 August 2019 that the diocese had "not one, not two, not three, but several" cases of sex abuse. On 28 August 2019, it was announced that Zanchetta's travel ban had been lifted and that he had returned to Rome.

On 7 November 2019, the main offices of the Diocese of Oran were raided by police as part of a different investigation Zanchetta for financial fraud. On 27 November 2019, Zanchetta returned voluntarily to Argentina and appeared in court earlier than required. A judge once again allowed Zanchetta to return to the Vatican provided he inform the court if he changed his address.

Zanchetta denied the charges and said that he was a victim of revenge by priests in Orán with whom he had differences. On 4 March 2022 he was found guilty of sexually abusing two seminarians and sentenced to four and a half years' imprisonment.

Diocese of Morón
In 2009, Julio Grassi was found guilty (by a three-judge panel of the Criminal Court Oral 1 Morón) of one count of sexual abuse and one count of corrupting a minor in the "Happy Children’s Foundation".

Archdiocese of Santa Fe de la Vera Cruz

Allegations of sexual abuse by Archbishop Edgardo Storni on 47 young seminarists surfaced in 1994, and were published in 2000. This led to a victim from a 1992 incident coming forward, followed by a conviction for eight years in December 2009.

Archdiocese of Mendoza
In 2016, two priests, Fr. Nicola Corradi and Fr. Horacio Corbacho, and three other men employed at one of the Antonio Provolo Institute for the Deaf's Argentine schools were arrested in Mendoza, Argentina in 2016 for abuse of children. Corradi had previously been accused as early as 2009 of committing sex abuse at the Antonio Provolo Institute for the Deaf's main campus in Verona, Italy. On 6 May 2017, Argentine authorities charged Japanese nun Sr Kosaka Kumiko with abusing children at the very same Argentine school as well, and also for covering up sex abuse committed by the two priests as well. On 15 June 2019, it was announced that the two priests will stand trial on 5 August 2019. The two priests will face trial in Argentina, where they were jailed after being accused of sexually abusing 22 children at the Argentine school. Former institute employee Armando Gomez also would serve as a co-defendant. The trial began as scheduled. Former institute employee Jorge Bordón had been sentenced to 10 years in prison in 2018 for sex abuse at the institute as well.
On 25 November 2019 priests Nicola Corradi, 83, and Horacio Corbacho, 59, were each found guilty of sexually abusing deaf children at a Catholic school for the deaf in Luján de Cuyo from 2004 to 2016. They were sentenced to 42 and 45 years in prison respectively. Their garderner Armando Gómez was jailed for 18 years. Aside from Gómez, several other school faculty, including Kumiko, have been jailed for complicity since the abuse allegations surfaced in 2016. At the time of the convictions, Kumiko was still being held in prison awaiting trial.
Two monks from the archdiocese's Christ at Prayer Monastery in the town of Tupungato were arrested on 27 December 2018 and charged with sexually abusing one boy and one adult male between 2009 and 2015. The monks, Fr. Diego Roque and Fr. Oscar Portillo, were originally from Buenos Aires and have led the monastery since its founding in 1996. Both monks will remain under house arrest until trial. The sex abuse allegations against the two monks, who still remain in custody, forced the Archdiocese to close the monastery, which then had only four monks, "until further notice" in January 2019.

Brazil 

Diocese of Anápolis
 Fr. Tarcísio Tadeu Spricigo was arrested after his checklist for choosing victims was found and given to police. He had molested children in at least five parishes. The case was one of those featured in an episode of the BBC's Panorama documentary series titled Sex Crimes and the Vatican and became an example of the Vatican's policies regarding pedophile priests. In November 2005 he was sentenced to a prison term of over 14 years.
 Fr. Felix Barbosa Carreiro was arrested and charged with child sexual abuse in the northeastern state of Maranhão after police seized him in a hotel room with four teenage boys.

Archdiocese of Penedo

 In 2010 authorities in Brazil began an investigation into three priests after a video allegedly showing a priest sexually abusing an altar boy was broadcast on the SBT television station.

Chile 

Archdiocese of Santiago
 José Andrés Aguirre Ovalle, aka "Cura Tato", was found guilty of nine sexual abuse charges by the highest court of this country. In 2004 Aguirre was sentenced to 12 years in jail. At the beginning of this trial, the Catholic Church was sentenced to pay 50 million in damages to the victims, but then this sentence was revoked by the supreme court.
 Ricardo Muñoz Quinteros, priest of Melipilla, was charged in 2010 with eight cases of sexually abusing minors, including his own daughter. Quinteros is also being investigated for producing pornographic material involving children.
 In 2010, the Catholic Church began an investigation into sexual abuse allegedly committed by Fr. Fernando Karadima, after four people came forward with allegations of abuse. He was found guilty and convicted by the Holy See on 18 February 2011. He was sentenced to a life of prayer and penitence, banned from any contact with his ex parishioners and forbidden to perform any priestly ministry in public or private except for mass by himself. Karadima has not acknowledged any wrongdoing. On 28 September 2018, Pope Francis issued a communique ordering the laicization of Karadima
 In 2018, a lawsuit was filed against the Archdiocese of Santiago for allegations of covering up sex abuse committed by Karadima On 27 March 2019, however the Court of Appeals ordered the Archdiocese to pay 100 million pesos (about US$147,000) for "moral damages" to each of the survivors: Juan Carlos Cruz, José Andrés Murillo and James Hamilton. The ruling was confirmed by their lawyer Juan Pablo Hermosilla and Santiago Bishop Celestino Aos on 28 March.

Diocese of Valparaíso
 Eduardo Olivares Martínez, was found guilty of a five sexual abuse against underprivileged minors. In 2006 was sentenced to 3 years in jail and to pay 15 million pesos in damages.
 In 2010, Juan Henríquez Zapata was indicted for using minors for sex services.

Diocese of Rancagua
 Jorge Galaz Espinoza, former Director of El Pequeño Cottolengo, was found guilty of repeated violations against two mentally disabled minors. In 2005 Galaz was sentenced to 15 years in jail.

Diocese of Punta Arenas
 Jaime Low Cabezas, was found guilty of a sexual abuse against a 15-year-old minor. In 2009 Low was sentenced to 3 years in jail.
 Víctor Hugo Carrera, was found guilty of a sexual abuse against one underprivileged minor. In 2005 Carrera was sentenced to 541 days in jail and to pay 2 million pesos in damages to the family of the victim. The case involved the bishop of the diocese, who was accused of protecting Carrera and facilitating his escape to Bolivia, where he lived for two years.

Marist Brothers Education Facilities
 Cristián Precht Bañados, was suspended from ministry from 2012 to 2017 after he was found guilty of sexually abusing minors and vulnerable adults at Marist Brothers facilities he visited. Was later laicized by Pope Francis in 2018
Miguel Ortega was also found guilty of sexually abusing children at Marist Brothers facilities. He died in 2015.
In 2017, it was revealed that at least 14 minors were abused by Marist Brother Abel Perez from the 1970s until 2000 at the Instituto Alonso de Ercilla and the Marcelino Champagnat schools in Chile. Perez confessed the alleged abuse to his superiors in 2010, and was then transferred to Peru.

Society of Jesus
 Rev. Stefan Dartmann disclosed that the same abusive teacher in Germany had been guilty of similar crimes in Jesuit schools in Chile and Spain.
In August 2019, revelations surfaced that Jesuit Father Renato Poblete, who died in 2010, had sexually abused 18 adult women and four underage female minors. He also impregnated at least one of these women and forced her to have an abortion. One of the minors he abused was only three years old and a daughter of one of his adult victims as well.

Peru 
In 2007, Daniel Bernardo Beltrán Murguía Ward, a 42-year-old Sodalitium Christianae Vitae (SCV) consecrated layman was found by the National Police in a hostel in Cercado de Lima with a 12-year-old boy, of whom he was taking sexually explicit pictures. The boy was initially lured by Murguía Ward in Miraflores, where he was given Pokémon figures in exchange for photos of his intimate parts. When Murguía Ward was caught, he had paid the boy 20 soles (US$7) for his services in the hostel. The police have reported that pictures of two other boys were also found on Murguía Ward's camera and that the boy has claimed he received oral sex from Murguía Ward. These charges have been denied by the accused. Murguía Ward has since been removed from the SCV for his alleged misconduct.

See also 

 Sexual abuse cases in Catholic church
 Catholic Church sex abuse cases
 Settlements and bankruptcies in Catholic sex abuse cases
 Catholic Church sex abuse cases in Australia
 Catholic Church sex abuse cases in Belgium
 Catholic Church sexual abuse cases in Canada
 Catholic Church sexual abuse cases in Dublin
 Catholic Church sex abuse cases in English Benedictine Congregation
 Catholic Church sexual abuse cases in Ireland
 Catholic sexual abuse cases in New Zealand
 Catholic Church sex abuse cases in the United States
 Parish transfers of abusive Catholic priests

 Sexual abuse cases in other Christian denominations
 Abuses in the Baptist Faith
 Jehovah's Witnesses and child sex abuse

 Critique & consequences related topics
 Criticism of Pope John Paul II
 Debate on the causes of clerical child abuse
 Ecclesiastical response to Catholic sex abuse cases
 Instruction Concerning the Criteria for the Discernment of Vocations with Regard to Persons with Homosexual Tendencies in View of Their Admission to the Seminary and to Holy Orders
 Media coverage of Catholic sex abuse cases
 Sex Crimes and the Vatican, BBC documentary
 Survivors Network of those Abused by Priests, NGO for victims in USA

 Investigation, prevention and victim support related topics
 Broken Rites Australia, support and advocacy group in Australia
 National Review Board, USA
 National Society for the Prevention of Cruelty to Children, UK
 Pontifical Commission for the Protection of Minors
 Sexual Addiction & Compulsivity, peer-reviewed journal on prevention & treatment
 Virtus (program), church initiative in USA
 Vos estis lux mundi, church procedure for abuse vases

 Other related topics
 Child sexual abuse
 Clerical celibacy
 Homosexual clergy in the Catholic Church
 Pontifical secret
 Religious abuse
 Spiritual abuse

References 

 
Catholic Church sexual abuse scandals
Sexual abuse cover-ups